Our Unwinding Ethos (lit. Twelve Legends) is an 2019 urban legend drama series produced by TVB. The story follows twelve well-known urban legends in Hong Kong. The series stars Edwin Siu, Rosina Lam, Jonathan Cheung and Moon Lau.  It is produced by Wong Wai Sing and edited by Li Qianyi.  It aired on TVB Jade from June 15, 2019 to August 16, 2019. First overseas premiere on Astro (television) between July 15 and August 16, 2019. The series tied in with the Ghost Festival (Yulan) in July. The series was featured at the Hong Kong International Film and Television Fair (2018) and the TVB Amazing Summer (2019).

Synopsis 
Poon Doh-lai (Lin Xiawei) while on-site investigating the legend of the Bride's Pool with her Folklore studies introductory class, witnesses supernatural activities transpiring around the bride-to-be, Topaz (Moon Lau). As the supernatural incidents continues to follow Topaz, she seek help from her journalist friend Fu Chi-Pok (Edwin Siu). Meanwhile, the groom's family is certain that Topaz is a Jinx, who have angered the bride's Spirit, and tries to break off the marriage.  Doh-lai and Chi-pok slowly discovers that the legend of the Bride's Pool was in fact used to cover up crimes, including the truth behind the death of Topaz's parents.  After the investigation, Doh-lai learns that Chik-Pok was the son of her mentor, Professor Fu (To Yin Gor), who has been missing for seven years. The two decide to finish Professor Fu's dissertation; however, during their research, they encounter several murder cases that used popular urban legends as a cover up. The two became acquaintances with police officer Yik Sir (Jonathan Cheung), who was a supernatural enthusiast. As the different cases unfold, they suspect that Professor Fu is alive and is perhaps captured.

Cast

Fu Family 
 To Yin Gor as Fu Tung-Ming (Professor Fu). Professor of Folklore studies at the International University of Hong Kong. A former teacher and director at Hong Kong Guowen Middle School.  For seven years Professor Fu was a missing person and eventually assumed dead. His disappearance is believed to be connected to the Fox Spirit legend.
 Edwin Siu as Fu Chi-Pok. A journalist at Breaking News and student of the Folklore at the Hong Kong International University. He is the son of Professor Fu, despite their estranged relationship, he misses and love his father. His love interest was Topaz, however, their relationship never developed due to his timid character. As the story progresses, he discovers that he had fallen for Poon Doh-lai.

Poon Family 
 Parkman Wong as Poon Mo. Father of Poon Da-li and Poon Doh-mei. Fook-chi's lover.
 Mary Hon as Chen Fook-chi (Sister Fortune). Pawnshop owner and Poon Mo's lover. 
 Jazz Lam as Poon Da-li (Master Dali). A metaphysicist and host of radio network program Network One Spirit One. Eldest son of Poon Mo and Fook-chi. 
 Rosina Lam as Dr. Poon Doh-lai (Lala). Assistant professor of the Department of Folklore, School of Humanities, International University of Hong Kong. Adoptive daughter of Sister Fortune. Uses the catch phrase: '兇手做咁多嘢,都係想模糊個視線,但係我已經睇清楚佢嘅原點' (The killer has done many things to blur our vision. But I can see the origin clearly now) before revealing/solving a crime. Adoptive daughter of Poon Mo and Fook-chi.  Trademark: gold pocket watch. 
 Kirby Lam as Poon Doh-mei (Sister Mi). Youngest daughter of Poon Mo and Fook-chi.

Recurring cast  
 Jonathan Cheung as Yik Ming Yin (Yik Sir)
 Moon Lau as Topaz Wong Yuk
Angel Chiang as Emily Ku Pan Sin
Lau Kong as Yik Yuen-Kwong 
Tammy Au Yueng as Bala
Bobo Yueng  as Bili
Lee Yee-man as Pong Chi Mung

Guest star 
 Stefan Wong as Pierre

Production 
The series was filmed from November 2017 to April 2018.

Language 
Our Unwinding Ethos is a series originally in Cantonese. The series have Dubbing (filmmaking) available in Mandarin Chinese and Vietnamese language; and Subtitles in Traditional Chinese characters, Simplified Chinese characters, English language and Indonesian.

Promotional clips 
Our Unwinding Ethos - Mini were two-minute promotional clips staged in the format of the TV show's fictional network program: Network One Spirit One. There is a total of five consecutive episodes hosted by Poon Doh-lai (Lin Xiawei)and Poon Da-li (Jazz Lam), inviting some of the main characters to talk  about their case.

Music 
The opening theme song "Rumors" performed by Auston Lam, and composed by Alan Cheung was released on July 26 in 2019 by The Voice Entertainment Group limited.

"Rumours" was nominated for "Most popular series song" during the TVB Awards Presentation in 2019.

Location

Bride Pool 

The local urban legend of the Bride's Pool, located near Tai Mei Tuk in Plover Cove Country Park was used as the setting for the introductory episodes of the series. In the traditional Chinese wedding, the bride would travel by litter (as known as sedan) to her groom. It is said that one of the four porters slipped. The bride, along with the sedan fell into the connecting river and she was trapped by the waterfall and washed into the pool below where she downed, unable to escape due to her heavy wedding dress. The villagers also failed to find the porter.

Mirror Pool 
The Mirror Pool Waterfall is located near by the Bride's pool in the Plover Cove Country Park. Some have claimed to have seen a bride dressed in a red Cheongsam brushing her hair at the Mirror Pool. The Spirit of the bride would drag victims into the water to ease her loneliness. Another Superstition in China is that the spirit of a person who have been drowned, continues to float along the surface of the water until it can drown another victim to take its place, and this was the only way the spirit can leave the earth or fulfil Reincarnation.

The Winding Road near the Bride's Pool 

In the Hong Kong legend, the bride's spirit would wander the area and favoured the nearby winding road, giving it the nickname "deadly curve". Several fatal accidents have been reported and is believed to be connected the evildoing of the deceased bride's spirit.

Wah Fu Estate 
Wah Fu Estate is a Public housing estate located next to Waterfall Bay, Hong Kong. It was built on a new town concept in 1967 and was renovated in 2003. The building was used as the backdrop of the UFO story line in Our Unwinding Ethos. In 1970s and 1980s the reports of a gigantic mother ship mysteriously hovering over Wah Fu Estate is Hong Kong's most enduring urban UFO myth. Witnesses described a spaceship as wide as a building hovering over the estate, on both occasions late in the afternoon. The craft was so large, they said, that buildings shook as it flew low over the estate.

New Territories West 
A saucer-like shining object was reported in New Territories West (constituency) in 1978. This site was also used in the UFO story line in episode 9.

Tai Mo Shan 
Tai Mo Shan is the highest peak in Hong Kong and located at approximately the geographical centre of the New Territories.  Tai Mo Shan is an inactive Volcano dating from the Jurassic period. The site is also used for the UFO story line.

Tat Tak School 
Tat Tak School was used as the backdrop for the eighth legend in Our Unwinding Ethos.  The building erected in 1974 and was originally based on the centuries-old Yu Kiu Ancestral Hall in Ping Shan. In 1998, the building closed and gained recognition for its paranormal activities. The urban tale follows the suicide of a headmistress who hanged herself in the female bathroom while wearing red dress. Leaving behind the lingering red-clothed spirit sighted over the years. In Chinese culture, when someone dies dressed in all red, they will return as powerful and angry spirit. The village where the school is located  has a history of tragedy, with local residents killed and buried in the area after resisting British efforts to evict them from their land. It has been said that a large number of villagers were massacred in 1941 during the Japanese occupation of Hong Kong, with their remains buried in graves built into the hillside next to the school. Today the site is abandoned and sits permanently guarded behind locked rusty gates.

Tai O 

Tai O is a fishing town, located on the western side of Lantau Island in Hong Kong. The site was used as the backdrop for the Lo Ting Fish-Man myth from episode 11. The Lo Ting is a half-man, half-fish hybrid, that populated the area around Tai Hai Shan, which was also called Tai Yu Shan (Big Fish Mountain), one of the old Cantonese names for Lantau Island. Hong Kong people believe they are descended from this ancient fish-like creature, which transformed into a human body some time in the past 2,000 years. Several ancient Chinese literature references about southern China portraying characters similar to Lo Ting.  "New Stories from Canton (Guang Dong Xin Yu)" published in 1662–1722, "Knowledge from Canton (Yu Chung Kin Mun)" from 1777,"Collection of Lingnan Narratives (Ling Nan Cong Shu)" from 1835, "Notes on the South (Nan Yue Bi Ji)" from 1809, "General Records of the Sun On County (Sun On Yu Zin)" from 1819, all contain passages about the half-human and half-fish creatures which were mysterious, able to get in-and-out of the sea quickly, not able to speak human languages, but had tails, red hair and a few other features with different descriptions in different versions.

Cheung Po Tsai Cave 
Cheung Po Tsai Cave is a natural cave located on Cheung Chau Island. During the Qing dynasty, Cheung Po Tsai was one of the many pirates who roved the Guangdong coast. According to urban legend, he had thousands of followers and a fleet of more than 600 ships. The coast and myth of Cheung Po was the setting for the geo-treasure hunt and murder case from episode 19 to 21.

Episodes

Cross-over with Barrack O'Karma (TV Series)
The character of Dr. Poon Doh-lai (Rosina Lam) makes a guest appearance in Barrack O'Karma (2019) in episode 17. The male protagonist, Siu Wai-ming (Joel Chan), visits Hong Kong International University to look for Dr Poon, in hopes to investigate the reason behind the strange and supernatural events at the Twilight Mansion, and its connection to a game called Eerie Mansion. The supernatural genre of Barrack O'Karma opposes to Our Unwinding Ethos detective plot, to which omits true supernatural events. Dr Poon suggests that the strange events may be a result of a copycat crime using the game to commit murder. She also provides Wai-ming with a novel entitled Sleepwalking, which has characters and a plot identical to the two leads in Golden Night Building. Although Dr Poon suggested that the writer could possibly be a prophet that can see the future, she remain sceptical about supernatural events and firmly believes that there is a logical answer- which is not the case for the supernatural fiction, Barrack O'Karma.

Rating 
Hong Kong Viewership with TVB Jade

Macau Viewership with TVB Anywhere

Awards and nominations

Development 

 November 13, 2017: Costume Fitting and Blessing Ceremony, Tseung Kwan O Industrial Estate, TVB City Studio One Common Room. 
The show originally had two episode per case, making it a 12-episode series. 
August 12, 2018: Original release date, however, this was temporarily postponed. 
The series was then re-edited into a 25-episode series.
 July 12, 2019: promotional event for Our Unwinding Ethos. 
 August 7, 2019: Last promotional event for Our Unwinding Ethos was held poolside.

Trivia 
 Episode 11: The fictional airline Solar Airways and Skylette Airlines was a reference to the TV-series: Triumph in the Skies II.
 Although they played good friends in the series, Mary Hon and To Yin Gor are real-life husband and wife.
 The TV series borrowed ideas from TVB's own urban legends. Over the years, some parts of the studio have been rumoured to be haunted.

References 

TVB dramas
Hong Kong television series
Hong Kong time travel television series
2010s Hong Kong television series